Vascões is a civil parish in the municipality of Paredes de Coura, Portugal. The population in 2011 was 223, in an area of 6.22 km².

References

Freguesias of Paredes de Coura